The 2003 Women's World Floorball Championships was the fourth world championship in women's floorball. The games were played in Bern, Gümligen and Wünnewil in Switzerland 17–24 May 2003. Sweden won the tournament, their second title defeating Switzerland, 8-1, in the final-game.

Italy, Malaysia and USA made their first appearances in the women's floorball world championships.

Division A
The two groups consists of the seven best placed teams in the previous world championships plus Russia who won the B-division in that tournament. With Norway beating Sweden in the first round of the groupstage, Sweden received their first loss against another team than Finland. Despite this, Sweden ended up winning the tournament. With Germany losing the 7th place match to the Czech Republic, Germany were relegated to division B for the next tournament.

The two best placed teams of each group advances to semifinals while the two lower placed teams plays placement matches for 5th and 7th place respectively.

Group A

Group B

Final stage

Statistics

Top scorers

Division B
The second division consists of all the teams from the same division in the previous tournament minus Russia who were promoted and Great Britain who didn't attend to the tournament. Austria, who were relegated from first division in the previous tournament and the three new teams: Italy, Malaysia and USA also played in the second division.
Japan ended up winning the B-final versus Poland and became promoted to the first division for the next tournament.

The two best placed teams in each group advances to play B-semifinals while the lower placed teams plays placement matches versus the corresponding team from the other group.

Group C

Group D

Final stage

B-Semifinals

17th place match

15th place match

13th place match

11th place match

9th place match

Top scorers

Final standings

Division A

*Germany relegated to division B for 2005

Division B

*Japan promoted to division A for 2005

All-star team
Goalkeeper: 
Defender: 
Defender: 
Centre: 
Forward: 
Forward: 

MVP: 
MVP:

References

External links
IFF Tournament Site

2003 in floorball
International floorball competitions hosted by Switzerland
Floorball World Championships
2003 in Swiss women's sport
May 2003 sports events in Europe
Sports competitions in Bern
21st century in Bern